Pondok Pesantren Gading Mangu Perak Jombang is an Islamic religious education in  Gading Mangu, Jombang, East Java Province. in Indonesia,   The school is managed by Yayasan Budi Utomo.

The school emphasizes the teaching of Al-Quran Al-Hadith and the formation of Karimah akhlakul.

Pondok Pesantren Gading Mangu currently accommodates 3,500 students, both girls and boys, from all over Indonesia. Of the total number of 1139 students of the school at SMU Budi Utomo, 917 people sat on the bench SMK Budi Utomo and 806 people became junior high school students Budi Utomo.

Operating since 1952, the scholl has dormitories, hostel building, hall, guest house, kitchen and activity center of the mosque Baitul Antiq

Brief History 
Boarding School Gadingmangu located in the Village Gadingmangu Gadingmangu, Silver District, Jombang, East Java, or about 13 kilometers from the city of Jombang. Distance from Surabaya Gadingmangu Boarding School about 93 miles or the distance of about 2 hours.

Pesanteren Gadingmangu cottage was founded in 1952 by:
 Mr. H. Bey Prawironoto (village head at the time)
 Mr. H.M. Mercy
 Mr. H. Nurhadi
 Mr. H. Nurhasan

Leadership Period:
 Year 1952 - 1963 led by Mr. H. Bey Prawironoto
 Year 1963 - 2006 led by Mr. KH. Abdul Syukur
 2006 - now led by Mr. KH. Ahmad Fathoni

Structure Ponpes Gadingmangu 
Pondok Pesantren Gadingmangu have an organizational structure as follows:
 Council Kyai: It is a supreme body consisting of elders boarding school authorities as the principal policy  Pondok Pesantren Gadingmangu-member 6 (six) people.
 Teacher Council: Council policy is the executing agency of the Kyai in the field of educational continuity. The agency consists of the Teacher / Ustad Pondok Pesantren Gadingmangu.
 Daily Council: An executive council in charge of daily administration, management and other social activities. Daily Board members consist of representatives from Chairman, Secretary, treasurer and parts.

Education Programs at Pondok Pesantren Gading Mangu

Religious education 
 Quran; reading, translations, and commentaries
 Hadith Association
 Faroidh; law of distribution of inheritance
 Qiroatu sab'ah
 Nahwu shorof
 Kutubu Sitta

General Education 
 Budi character / akhlakul Karimah
 Insights nationality
 Sports and Outbound
 Entrepreneurship and
 Community Service

External links
 Web Pondok Pesantren Gading Mangu Perak Jombang
 Web SMA Budi Utomo
 Web SMK Budi Utomo
 Official Website of LDII
 LDII  Jatim
 LDII Sidoarjo

Pesantren in Indonesia